Heimen Lagerwaard (23 April 1929 – 29 December 2006) was a Dutch footballer. He played in one match for the Netherlands national football team in 1953.

References

External links
 

1929 births
2006 deaths
Dutch footballers
Netherlands international footballers
Place of birth missing
Association footballers not categorized by position